Adam Brand is the debut studio album by Australian recording artist Adam Brand. The album was released in July 1998 and peaked at number 44 on the ARIA charts. A special bonus tour edition was released in 1999. The album was certified gold in 1999 and was  platinum in 2006.

The album was nominated for ARIA Award for Best Country Album at the ARIA Music Awards of 1999

Track listing

Charts

Certifications

Release history

References

1998 debut albums
Adam Brand (musician) albums
Mushroom Records albums